William John Bowser (Rexton, New Brunswick December 3, 1867 – October 25, 1933 Vancouver) was a politician in British Columbia, Canada. He served as the 17th premier of British Columbia from 1915 to 1916.

The son of William Bowser and Margaret Gordon, Bowser was educated at Mount Allison University and Dalhousie University. He moved to Vancouver to practice law in 1891, and was first elected to the provincial legislature in the 1903 election as a Conservative. Bowser served as Attorney-General in the cabinet of Sir Richard McBride from 1907 until 1915. As Attorney-General, Bowser forced the Squamish First Nation, then the False Creek Indian Band, off Kitsilano Indian Reserve no.6.

In 1915, he succeeded McBride as Premier.

The Conservative party was deeply divided and unpopular and the change in leadership did not improve matters. Accusations of corruption and "machine politics" were rife. The Conservatives also neglected to address popular demands for women's suffrage and prohibition. Bowser's government was defeated in the 1916 election, losing to Liberal leader Harlan Carey Brewster, who two years later was succeeded by the more memorable John Oliver. Bowser continued as leader of the opposition until he lost his seat in the 1924 election.

He returned to politics in the 1933 election to lead the Non-Partisan Independent Group of candidates, but died during the election campaign.

A river, a lake and the small community of Bowser on Vancouver Island, between Parksville and the Comox Valley, are named for Bowser.

References 

1867 births
1933 deaths
Premiers of British Columbia
British Columbia Conservative Party leaders
British Columbia Conservative Party MLAs
Canadian Presbyterians
People from Kent County, New Brunswick
Attorneys General of British Columbia
Mount Allison University alumni
Dalhousie University alumni